Bukhara is a rural locality (a village) in Tiginskoye Rural Settlement, Vozhegodsky District, Vologda Oblast, Russia. The population was 16 as of 2002.

Geography 
Bukhara is located 31 km northwest of Vozhega (the district's administrative centre) by road. Ogarkovskaya is the nearest rural locality.

References 

Rural localities in Vozhegodsky District